Kiyani also spelled Kayani or Kiani, is a title used by Gakhars, the tribe based in the Pothohar region of Pakistani Punjab. The name means "Royal" or "Kingly", similar to the name "Raja" or "Prince".

See also 
 Gakhars
 Tribes and clans of the Pothohar Plateau
 Punjabi Muslims
 Sarang Gakhar (Chief of Gakhars)

References

Noble titles
Punjabi culture
Punjabi words and phrases